ι Ophiuchi, Latinized as Iota Ophiuchi, is a single star in the equatorial constellation of Ophiuchus, positioned near the constellation border with Hercules. It makes a naked-eye double with nearby Kappa Ophiuchi, appearing as a faint, blue-white hued star with an apparent visual magnitude of 4.39. The star is approximately 245 light years from the Sun based on parallax, but is drifting closer with a radial velocity of −19 km/s.

This object is a B-type main-sequence star with a stellar classification of B8V. It is an estimated 217 million years old with a moderately high rate of spin, showing a projected rotational velocity of 124 km/s. The star has 3.1 times the mass of the Sun and around 2.8 times the Sun's radius. Iota Ophiuchi is radiating 141 times the luminosity of the Sun from its photosphere at an effective temperature of 11,220 K. It displays an infrared excess, suggesting the presence of circumstellar material.

References

B-type main-sequence stars
Ophiuchus (constellation)
Ophiuchi, Iota
BD+10 3092
Ophiuchi, 25
152614
082673
6281